The Traveler is a  cast aluminum sculpture by Richard Beyer, installed at the corner of Franklin and Wall in Bend, Oregon. The statue, nicknamed "Art", was installed in 1982 and depicts a man sitting on a bench, with two ducks. It was temporarily removed in December 2020 for repairs. People often take photographs with the man, or place objects in his wallet.

See also

 List of public art in Bend, Oregon

References

External links
 “Sculpture” by Richard Beyer, Bend, Oregon at Waymarking

1982 establishments in Oregon
1982 sculptures
Aluminum sculptures in Oregon
Birds in art
Buildings and structures in Bend, Oregon
Outdoor sculptures in Oregon
Sculptures of men in Oregon
Statues in Oregon